Class 7 may refer to:
 British Rail Class 07
 BR Standard Class 7
 HAZMAT Class 7 Radioactive substances
 L&YR Class 7
 LMS Class 7F 0-8-0
 NSB Class 7, a standard-gauge steam locomotive of Norway
 NSB Class VII, a narrow-gauge steam locomotive of Norway
 Class VII (U.S. Army), Major items: A final combination of end products which is ready for its intended use: (principal item) for example, launchers, tanks, mobile machine shops, vehicles 
 NSB El 7, an electric locomotive of Norway
 NSB Di 7, a diesel locomotive of Norway
 Surface of class VII, non-algebraic complex surface
 TS Class 7, a tram of Trondheim, Norway
 Class 7 truck, a US truck class for heavy trucks up to 33,000 pounds weight limit